Son-Rise: A Miracle of Love is a televised docudrama film that aired on NBC in 1979 and is adapted from the nonfiction book Son-Rise (currently Son-Rise: The Miracle Continues) by Barry Neil Kaufman. It is the real-life story of how, according to his parents, Raun Kaufman completely recovered from severe autism. The film was directed by Glenn Jordan and the teleplay was written by Stephen Kandel, Samahria Lyte Kaufman, and Barry Neil Kaufman.

The film tells of Bears and Suzie Kaufman and their newly born son, Raun. By the time he was eighteen months old, Raun was diagnosed with a perpetual disability known as classic autism—which, at the time, was classified as a form of childhood schizophrenia—and had mental retardation. Accordingly, "although advised to institutionalize Raun, his parents...instead created an innovative home-based, child-centered program in an effort to reach [him]." Subsequently, Raun became typical of neural development and earned his master's degree from Brown University. The film went on to receive the Humanitas Prize award.

The therapeutic, distraction play therapy progressed into a teaching model called The Son-Rise Program. By 1983, Bears and Samahria Kaufman founded The Option Institute and the Autism Treatment Center of America in Berkshire County, Massachusetts. Raun, his family and other staff members currently serve on the board of directors.

Plot
Raun was born "like all, perfect" to Bears and Suzi Kaufman. Eventually, his parents noticed that Raun could only see certain things and sometimes hear. He also lost a couple of words that he had been taught. He had 12 out of 13 symptoms of autism. Medical professionals were pessimistic about Raun's condition. The only options offered to the Kaufmans at the time was either institutionalization or involvement in a behavior modification-style program that included aversive therapy. Spanking and electrical shock treatment are two examples for this program. His parents also witnessed young children being locked into cabinets by clinicians; other children had their hands tied to the back of chairs for hand-flapping, a self-stimulatory behavior common to autism.

The Kaufmans decided to work with Raun, although he had not yet reached the age of two. The Kaufmans' utilized their downstairs restroom which was the only place free of distractions. When Raun flapped his hands and spun plates, so did Suzi and Bears — joining Raun. After Suzi spun plates with Raun for several months, Raun looked directly at Suzi and smiled for the first time since Raun had become autistic. Other forms of contact Raun made included crying, when he was thirsty for juice, as well as water. Raun's mother worked with him for a total of 70 to 80 hours a week and his father sold his advertising agency to have more time to work with his son. However, Raun relapsed into spinning plates without making contact, causing his parents to start all over until he made contact again. The Kaufmans' work was successful. At the end of the film, Raun was six years old and known as "a happy, active, bright, and loving normal boy."

Production
Principal photography took place in California. Because of California child labor laws that prohibits children from working over three hours, twin brothers Michael and Casey Adams portrayed the role of Raun.

The film was directed by Glenn Jordan, produced by Richard M. Rosenbloom, and executive produced by Bernard Rothman and Jack Wohl with the teleplay written by Stephen Kandel, Samahria Lyte Kaufman, and Barry Neil Kaufman. Throughout the film, singer Debby Boone sang the track "Is There Room in Your World for Me?"

Cast
The cast that played the role of the Kaufman family are listed below.
 James Farentino as Bears Kaufman.
 Kathryn Harrold as Suzi Kaufman.
Michael and Casey Adams as Raun Kaufman. Michael and Casey are twin siblings and are the great-grandsons of the well-known film director King Vidor.
Shelby Balik as Bryn Kaufman.
 Missy Francis as Thea Kaufman.
 Kerry Sherman as Nancy, the family's nanny.

Awards and nominations
In 1980, Samahria Lyte Kaufman, Barry Neil Kaufman, and Stephen Kandel earned a Humanitas Prize award in the 90-minute category.

References

External links
 The Option Institute
 The Autism Treatment Center of America: The Son-Rise Program
 Barry Neil Kaufman

1979 films
American docudrama films
Films about autism
Films directed by Glenn Jordan
1970s American films
Films about disability